Kalentzi is a village and a former community in Achaea, West Greece, Greece. Since the 2011 local government reform it is part of the municipality Erymanthos, of which it is a municipal unit. The municipal unit has an area of 23.907 km2. The population of the village was 71 in 2011, and of the municipal unit 380. It is renowned in Greece as the ancestral home of the Papandreou political dynasty. Kalentzi is situated on the northern slope of Mount Erymanthos, about 35 km south of Patras.

Subdivisions
The municipal unit Kalentzi is subdivided into the following villages:
 Kalentzi
 Agios Georgios, Erymanthos
 Diaselo (also known as Avrami)
 Bantzaiika

Notable people 
Georgios Papandreou (1888–1968) politician

References

Populated places in Achaea